Rhadinosticta simplex is a species of damselfly in the family Isostictidae. It is commonly known as the powdered wiretail. It is located in Australia, where it is fairly common and localised.

Identification 
Its abdomen is very long and slender, and extends well beyond the wing-tips. The damselfly has green eyes, a narrow reddish antehumeral stripe and some narrow broken pale green markings on the side of the thorax. Its abdomen is all black above with distinct pale green sides.

Behaviour 
The powdered wiretail has weak fluttery flight. It often flies in shaded areas around vegetation hanging over the stream edge, such as black wattle. Many males in groups can be found perching high up above water.

Distribution 
Rhadinosticta simplex has been recorded in Australia from near Cooktown in Queensland to Melbourne in Victoria.

Habitat 
Rhadinosticta simplex is found among thick tea-tree beside slow-flowing sections of a river.

Flight period 
The damselfly has of flight season from December to April. In Victoria it can be seen in flight during summer and most of autumn. Further north they can emerge earlier.

Similar species 
Rhadinosticta simplex is very similar to Rhadinosticta banksi except for more distinct markings on its synthorax, and minor anatomical differences.

Gallery

References

Isostictidae
Odonata of Australia
Insects of Australia
Endemic fauna of Australia
Taxa named by René Martin
Insects described in 1901
Damselflies